Pseudoalteromonas undina is a marine bacterium isolated from seawater off the coast of Northern California. It was originally classified as Alteromonas undina but was reclassified in 1995 to the genus Pseudoalteromonas.

References

External links
Type strain of Pseudoalteromonas undina at BacDive -  the Bacterial Diversity Metadatabase

Alteromonadales
Bacteria described in 1978